Brianna Salinaro (born May 10, 1998) is a taekwondo practitioner set to represent the United States at the 2020 Summer Paralympics. She has cerebral palsy and is from Massapequa, New York. She started Taekwondo at age 9 and in 2016 became the first female para Taekwondo athlete to represent the United States at an international tournament. She was the only Para Taekwondo athlete to compete at the 2020 Paralympic games with Cerebral Palsy. All of Brianna's competitors were upper amputee athletes.  She compete in the K44 -58kg category.

1998 births
Living people
American female taekwondo practitioners
Paralympic taekwondo practitioners of the United States
Sportspeople with cerebral palsy
People from Massapequa, New York
Taekwondo practitioners at the 2020 Summer Paralympics
Sportspeople from Nassau County, New York
21st-century American women